Euler–Bernoulli beam theory (also known as engineer's beam theory or classical beam theory) is a simplification of the linear theory of elasticity which provides a means of calculating the load-carrying and deflection characteristics of beams. It covers the case corresponding to small deflections of a beam that is subjected to lateral loads only. By ignoring the effects of shear deformation and rotatory inertia, it is thus a special case of Timoshenko–Ehrenfest beam theory. It was first enunciated circa 1750, but was not applied on a large scale until the development of the Eiffel Tower and the Ferris wheel in the late 19th century. Following these successful demonstrations, it quickly became a cornerstone of engineering and an enabler of the Second Industrial Revolution.

Additional mathematical models have been developed, such as plate theory, but the simplicity of beam theory makes it an important tool in the sciences, especially structural and mechanical engineering.

History 

Prevailing consensus is that Galileo Galilei made the first attempts at developing a theory of beams, but recent studies argue that Leonardo da Vinci was the first to make the crucial observations. Da Vinci lacked Hooke's law and calculus to complete the theory, whereas Galileo was held back by an incorrect assumption he made.

The Bernoulli beam is named after Jacob Bernoulli, who made the significant discoveries.  Leonhard Euler and Daniel Bernoulli were the first to put together a useful theory circa 1750.

Static beam equation 

Explicitly, for a beam whose axis is oriented along  with a loading along , the beam's cross section is in the  plane, and the relevant second moment of area is

Often, the product  (known as the flexural rigidity) is a constant, so that

This equation, describing the deflection of a uniform, static beam, is used widely in engineering practice. Tabulated expressions for the deflection  for common beam configurations can be found in engineering handbooks. For more complicated situations, the deflection can be determined by solving the Euler–Bernoulli equation using techniques such as "direct integration", "Macaulay's method", "moment area method, "conjugate beam method", "the principle of virtual work", "Castigliano's method", "flexibility method", "slope deflection method", "moment distribution method", or "direct stiffness method".

Sign conventions are defined here since different conventions can be found in the literature.  In this article, a right-handed coordinate system is used with the  axis to the right, the  axis pointing upwards, and the  axis pointing into the figure. The sign of the bending moment  is taken as positive when the torque vector associated with the bending moment on the right hand side of the section is in the positive  direction, that is, a positive value of  produces compressive stress at the bottom surface. With this choice of bending moment sign convention, in order to have , it is necessary that the shear force  acting on the right side of the section be positive in the  direction so as to achieve static equilibrium of moments. If the loading intensity  is taken positive in the positive  direction, then   is necessary for force equilibrium.

Successive derivatives of the deflection  have important physical meanings:  is the slope of the beam, which is the anti-clockwise angle of rotation about the -axis in the limit of small displacements;

is the bending moment in the beam; and

is the shear force in the beam.

The stresses in a beam can be calculated from the above expressions after the deflection due to a given load has been determined.

Derivation of the bending equation 

Because of the fundamental importance of the bending moment equation in engineering, we will provide a short derivation. We change to polar coordinates.

The stress of this fiber is  where  is the elastic modulus in accordance with Hooke's Law. The differential force vector,  resulting from this stress is given by,

This is the differential force vector exerted on the right hand side of the section shown in the figure. We know that it is in the  direction since the figure clearly shows that the fibers in the lower half are in tension.  is the differential element of area at the location of the fiber.

This expression is valid for the fibers in the lower half of the beam. The expression for the fibers in the upper half of the beam will be similar except that the moment arm vector will be in the positive  direction and the force vector will be in the  direction since the upper fibers are in compression.  But the resulting bending moment vector will still be in the  direction since   Therefore, we integrate over the entire cross section of the beam and get for  the bending moment vector exerted on the right cross section of the beam the expression

where  is the second moment of area. From calculus, we know that when  is small, as it is for an Euler–Bernoulli beam, we can make the approximation , where  is the radius of curvature. Therefore,

This vector equation can be separated in the bending unit vector definition ( is oriented as ), and in the bending equation:

Dynamic beam equation 

The dynamic beam equation is the Euler–Lagrange equation for the  following action

The first term represents the kinetic energy where  is the mass per unit length, the second term represents the potential energy due to internal forces (when considered with a negative sign), and the third term represents the potential energy due to the external load . The Euler–Lagrange equation is used to determine the function that minimizes the functional .  For a dynamic Euler–Bernoulli beam, the Euler–Lagrange equation is

Free vibration 
In the absence of a transverse load, we have the free vibration equation.  This equation can be solved using a Fourier decomposition of the displacement into the sum of harmonic vibrations of the form

where  is the frequency of vibration. Then, for each value of frequency, we can solve an ordinary differential equation

The general solution of the above equation is

where  are constants. These constants are unique for a given set of boundary conditions. However, the solution for the displacement is not unique and depends on the frequency. These solutions are typically written as

The quantities  are called the natural frequencies of the beam.  Each of the displacement solutions is called a mode, and the shape of the displacement curve is called a mode shape.

Example: Cantilevered beam 

The boundary conditions for a cantilevered beam of length  (fixed at ) are

If we apply these conditions, non-trivial solutions are found to exist only if

This nonlinear equation can be solved numerically.

The corresponding natural frequencies of vibration are

The boundary conditions can also be used to determine the mode shapes from the solution for the displacement:

Solutions to the undamped forced problem have unbounded displacements when the driving frequency matches a natural frequency , i.e., the beam can resonate. The natural frequencies of a beam therefore correspond to the frequencies at which resonance can occur.

Example: free–free (unsupported) beam 

A free–free beam is a beam without any supports.

If we apply these conditions, non-trivial solutions are found to exist only if

This nonlinear equation can be solved numerically.

The corresponding natural frequencies of vibration are:

The boundary conditions can also be used to determine the mode shapes from the solution for the displacement:

Also, solutions to the undamped forced problem have unbounded displacements when the driving frequency matches a natural frequency .

Stress 
Besides deflection, the beam equation describes forces and moments and can thus be used to describe stresses. For this reason, the Euler–Bernoulli beam equation is widely used in engineering, especially civil and mechanical, to determine the strength (as well as deflection) of beams under bending.

Both the bending moment and the shear force cause stresses in the beam. The stress due to shear force is maximum along the neutral axis of the beam (when the width of the beam, t, is constant along the cross section of the beam; otherwise an integral involving the first moment and the beam's width needs to be evaluated for the particular cross section), and the maximum tensile stress is at either the top or bottom surfaces. Thus the maximum principal stress in the beam may be neither at the surface nor at the center but in some general area. However, shear force stresses are negligible in comparison to bending moment stresses in all but the stockiest of beams as well as the fact that stress concentrations commonly occur at surfaces, meaning that the maximum stress in a beam is likely to be at the surface.

Simple or symmetrical bending 

For beam cross-sections that are symmetrical about a plane perpendicular to the neutral plane, it can be shown that the tensile stress experienced by the beam may be expressed as:

Note that this equation implies that pure bending (of positive sign) will cause zero stress at the neutral axis, positive (tensile) stress at the "top" of the beam, and negative (compressive) stress at the bottom of the beam; and also implies that the maximum stress will be at the top surface and the minimum at the bottom. This bending stress may be superimposed with axially applied stresses, which will cause a shift in the neutral (zero stress) axis.

Maximum stresses at a cross-section 

These stresses are

The quantities  are the section moduli and are defined as

The section modulus combines all the important geometric information about a beam's section into one quantity.  For the case where a beam is doubly symmetric,  and we have one section modulus .

Strain in an Euler–Bernoulli beam 
We need an expression for the strain in terms of the deflection of the neutral surface to relate the stresses in an Euler–Bernoulli beam to the deflection.  To obtain that expression we use the assumption that normals to the neutral surface remain normal during the deformation and that deflections are small.  These assumptions imply that the beam bends into an arc of a circle of radius  (see Figure 1) and that the neutral surface does not change in length during the deformation.

Let  be the length of an element of the neutral surface in the undeformed state.  For small deflections, the element does not change its length after bending but deforms into an arc of a circle of radius .  If  is the angle subtended by this arc, then .

However, after bending, the length of the element becomes . The strain in that segment of the beam is given by

where  is the curvature of the beam.  This gives us the axial strain in the beam as a function of distance from the neutral surface.  However, we still need to find a relation between the radius of curvature and the beam deflection .

Relation between curvature and beam deflection 
Let P be a point on the neutral surface of the beam at a distance  from the origin of the  coordinate system.  The slope of the beam is approximately equal to the angle made by the neutral surface with the -axis for the small angles encountered in beam theory.  Therefore, with this approximation,

Therefore, for an infinitesimal element , the relation  can be written as

Hence the strain in the beam may be expressed as

Stress-strain relations 
Hence the stress in an Euler–Bernoulli beam is given by

Note that the above relation, when compared with the relation between the axial stress and the bending moment, leads to

Boundary considerations 
To find a unique solution  we need four boundary conditions. The boundary conditions usually model supports, but they can also model point loads, distributed loads and moments. The support or displacement boundary conditions are used to fix values of displacement and rotations on the boundary. Such boundary conditions are also called Dirichlet boundary conditions. Flux boundary conditions are also called Neumann boundary conditions.

As an example consider a cantilever beam that is built-in at one end and free at the other as shown in the adjacent figure.  At the built-in end of the beam there cannot be any displacement or rotation of the beam.  This means that at the left end both deflection and slope are zero.  Since no external bending moment is applied at the free end of the beam, the bending moment at that location is zero.  In addition, if there is no external force applied to the beam, the shear force at the free end is also zero.

A simple support (pin or roller) is equivalent to a point force on the beam which is adjusted in such a way as to fix the position of the beam at that point. A fixed support or clamp, is equivalent to the combination of a point force and a point torque which is adjusted in such a way as to fix both the position and slope of the beam at that point. Point forces and torques, whether from supports or directly applied, will divide a beam into a set of segments, between which the beam equation will yield a continuous solution, given four boundary conditions, two at each end of the segment. Assuming that the product EI is a constant, and defining  where F is the magnitude of a point force, and  where M is the magnitude of a point torque, the boundary conditions appropriate for some common cases is given in the table below. The change in a particular derivative of w across the boundary as x increases is denoted by  followed by that derivative. When the values of the particular derivative are not only continuous across the boundary, but fixed as well, the boundary condition is written e.g.,  which actually constitutes two separate equations (e.g.,  = fixed).

{| class="wikitable"
|-
! Boundary
! 
! 
! 
! 
|-
| Clamp
|
|
| 
| 
|-
| Simple support
|
| 
| 
| 
|-
| Point force
| 
| 
| 
| 
|-
| Point torque
| 
| 
| 
| 
|-
| Free end
| 
| 
|
|
|-
| Clamp at end
|
|
|  fixed
|  fixed
|-
| Simply supported end
|
| 
|
|  fixed
|-
| Point force at end
| 
| 
|
|
|-
| Point torque at end
| 
| 
|
|
|}

Note that in the first cases, in which the point forces and torques are located between two segments, there are four boundary conditions, two for the lower segment, and two for the upper. When forces and torques are applied to one end of the beam, there are two boundary conditions given which apply at that end. The sign of the point forces and torques at an end will be positive for the lower end, negative for the upper end.

Loading considerations 
Applied loads may be represented either through boundary conditions or through the function  which represents an external distributed load. Using distributed loading is often favorable for simplicity. Boundary conditions are, however, often used to model loads depending on context; this practice being especially common in vibration analysis.

By nature, the distributed load is very often represented in a piecewise manner, since in practice a load isn't typically a continuous function. Point loads can be modeled with help of the Dirac delta function. For example, consider a static uniform cantilever beam of length  with an upward point load  applied at the free end. Using boundary conditions, this may be modeled in two ways.  In the first approach, the applied point load is approximated by a shear force applied at the free end.  In that case the governing equation and boundary conditions are:

Alternatively we can represent the point load as a distribution using the Dirac function.  In that case the equation and boundary conditions are

Note that shear force boundary condition (third derivative) is removed, otherwise there would be a contradiction. These are equivalent boundary value problems, and both yield the solution

The application of several point loads at different locations will lead to  being a piecewise function. Use of the Dirac function greatly simplifies such situations; otherwise the beam would have to be divided into sections, each with four boundary conditions solved separately. A well organized family of functions called Singularity functions are often used as a shorthand for the Dirac function, its derivative, and its antiderivatives.

Dynamic phenomena can also be modeled using the static beam equation by choosing appropriate forms of the load distribution. As an example, the free vibration of a beam can be accounted for by using the load function:

where  is the linear mass density of the beam, not necessarily a constant. With this time-dependent loading, the beam equation will be a partial differential equation:

Another interesting example describes the deflection of a beam rotating with a constant angular frequency of :

This is a centripetal force distribution. Note that in this case,  is a function of the displacement (the dependent variable), and the beam equation will be an autonomous ordinary differential equation.

Examples

Three-point bending 
The three-point bending test is a classical experiment in mechanics. It represents the case of a beam resting on two roller supports and subjected to a concentrated load applied in the middle of the beam.  The shear is constant in absolute value: it is half the central load, P / 2. It changes sign in the middle of the beam. The bending moment varies linearly from one end, where it is 0, and the center where its absolute value is PL / 4, is where the risk of rupture is the most important.
The deformation of the beam is described by a polynomial of third degree over a half beam (the other half being symmetrical).

The bending moments, shear forces, and deflections for a beam subjected to a central point load and an asymmetric point load are given in the table below.

Cantilever beams 
Another important class of problems involves cantilever beams.  The bending moments, shear forces, and deflections for a cantilever beam subjected to a point load at the free end and a uniformly distributed load are given in the table below.

Solutions for several other commonly encountered configurations are readily available in textbooks on mechanics of materials and engineering handbooks.

Statically indeterminate beams 
The bending moments and shear forces in Euler–Bernoulli beams can often be determined directly using static balance of forces and moments.  However, for certain boundary conditions, the number of reactions can exceed the number of independent equilibrium equations.  Such beams are called statically indeterminate.

The built-in beams shown in the figure below are statically indeterminate.  To determine the stresses and deflections of such beams, the most direct method is to solve the Euler–Bernoulli beam equation with appropriate boundary conditions.  But direct analytical solutions of the beam equation are possible only for the simplest cases.  Therefore, additional techniques such as linear superposition are often used to solve statically indeterminate beam problems.

The superposition method involves adding the solutions of a number of statically determinate problems which are chosen such that the boundary conditions for the sum of the individual problems add up to those of the original problem.

Another commonly encountered statically indeterminate beam problem is the cantilevered beam with the free end supported on a roller.  The bending moments, shear forces, and deflections of such a beam are listed below:

Extensions 

The kinematic assumptions upon which the Euler–Bernoulli beam theory is founded allow it to be extended to more advanced analysis.  Simple superposition allows for three-dimensional transverse loading.  Using alternative constitutive equations can allow for viscoelastic or plastic beam deformation.  Euler–Bernoulli beam theory can also be extended to the analysis of curved beams, beam buckling, composite beams, and geometrically nonlinear beam deflection.

Euler–Bernoulli beam theory does not account for the effects of transverse shear strain.  As a result, it underpredicts deflections and overpredicts natural frequencies.  For thin beams (beam length to thickness ratios of the order 20 or more) these effects are of minor importance.  For thick beams, however, these effects can be significant.  More advanced beam theories such as the Timoshenko beam theory (developed by the Russian-born scientist Stephen Timoshenko) have been developed to account for these effects.

Large deflections 

The original Euler–Bernoulli theory is valid only for infinitesimal strains and small rotations.  The theory can be extended in a straightforward manner to problems involving moderately large rotations provided that the strain remains small by using the von Kármán strains.

The Euler–Bernoulli hypotheses that plane sections remain plane and normal to the axis of the beam lead to displacements of the form

Using the definition of the Lagrangian Green strain from finite strain theory, we can find the von Kármán strains for the beam that are valid for large rotations but small strains by discarding all the higher-order terms (which contain more than two fields) except 
 
The resulting strains take the form: 
 
From the principle of virtual work, the balance of forces and moments in the beams gives us the equilibrium equations

where  is the axial load,  is the transverse load, and

To close the system of equations we need the constitutive equations that relate stresses to strains (and hence stresses to displacements).  For large rotations and small strains these relations are

where

For the situation where the beam has a uniform cross-section and no axial load, the governing equation for a large-rotation Euler–Bernoulli beam is

See also 
 Applied mechanics
 Bending
 Bending moment
 Buckling
 Flexural rigidity
 Generalised beam theory
 Plate theory
 Sandwich theory
 Shear and moment diagram
 Singularity function
 Strain (materials science)
 Timoshenko beam theory
 Theorem of three moments (Clapeyron's theorem)
 Three-point flexural test

References

Notes

Citations

Further reading

External links

 Beam stress & deflection, beam deflection tables 

Elasticity (physics)
Equations
Leonhard Euler
Mechanical engineering
Solid mechanics
Structural analysis